Koll Rock, also known as Blake Island is a large rock located  southeast of Oom Island in the west side of Oom Bay, Mac. Robertson Land, Antarctica. It was mapped by Norwegian cartographers from air photos taken by the Lars Christensen Expedition, 1936–37, and named Kollskjer (knoll rock).

References

Rock formations of Mac. Robertson Land